Ashwini Chidananda Shetty Akkunji (born 7 October 1987) is an Indian sprint athlete from Siddapura, Udupi who specializes in 400 metres. Ashwini has won Gold Medals at the 2010 Commonwealth Games and the 2010 Asian Games in 4x400 m relay team event with Manjeet Kaur, Mandeep Kaur and Sini Jose and an individual gold medal in the 400 metres hurdles on 25 November 2010 at the 2010 Asian Games held at Guangzhou, in China. She is also a recipient of the Rajyotsava Prashasti (2010), a civilian honour awarded by the Indian State Government of Karnataka

Bio
Born in Siddapura, Udupi, Kundapura taluk, Udupi district, Karnataka, she was raised in a Tulu-speaking family to her mother, Yashoda Shetty Akkunji and father, B.R. Chidananda Shetty. Ashwini hails from an agriculturist family. with a sporting legacy. She grew up on her family's 5 acre farmland amidst Areca nut plantations along with her elder siblings a sister, Dipti and a brother, Amith. Earlier, Ashwini was employed with the Indian Railways, and as a manager in Corporation bank in Patiala, Punjab and presently works as a coach in Sports Authority of India Bangalore.

Doping

In July 2011 prior to Asian athletics championships in Kobe (Japan) she tested positive for anabolic steroids. She was subsequently dropped from the athletics team for the event and was suspended from athletics. She denied the charges but on 23 December 2011 the NADA banned her for a year. The Court of Arbitration for Sport (CAS) upheld an appeal by the International Association of Athletics Federations against lighter sentences and handed Ashwini and 5 other athletes (Mandeep Kaur, Sini Jose, Jauna Murmu, Tiana Mary and Priyanka Panwar) a two-year ban.

Awards, rewards and recognition

She was given the Karnataka Rajyotsava Award in 2010. This comprised a cash payment of one hundred thousand Rupees, a 20 gramme gold medallion and a grant of priority in the allotment of house sites by the Bangalore Development Authority (BDA). She has been rewarded financially by both the national and state governments, as well as Indian Railways, in recognition of the gold medals won in 2010.

References

External links

Living people
1987 births
People from Udupi district
Sportswomen from Karnataka
Indian female sprinters
Indian female hurdlers
21st-century Indian women
21st-century Indian people
Commonwealth Games gold medallists for India
Commonwealth Games medallists in athletics
Athletes (track and field) at the 2010 Commonwealth Games
Athletes (track and field) at the 2014 Commonwealth Games
Asian Games gold medalists for India
Asian Games medalists in athletics (track and field)
Athletes (track and field) at the 2010 Asian Games
Athletes (track and field) at the 2014 Asian Games
Doping cases in athletics
Indian sportspeople in doping cases
Kannada people
Medalists at the 2010 Asian Games
Athletes from Karnataka
Recipients of the Rajyotsava Award 2010
South Asian Games silver medalists for India
South Asian Games medalists in athletics
Medallists at the 2010 Commonwealth Games